Long Beach Boulevard is a north–south thoroughfare in Los Angeles County.

Geography
Long Beach Boulevard starts off as a continuation of Pacific Boulevard south of Cudahy Street in Walnut Park.  Long Beach Boulevard passes through South Gate, Lynwood, Compton and Long Beach.  It ends at Ocean Boulevard in Long Beach.

It crosses intersection with Firestone Boulevard (formerly State Route 42), Interstate 105 (Century Freeway), State Route 91 (Gardena Freeway), Interstate 710 (Long Beach Freeway), Interstate 405 (San Diego Freeway), and State Route 1 (Pacific Coast Highway).

History
A segment of this street in Long Beach was originally named American Avenue, a name provided by local developer William Willmore.  In 1958, Gerald Desmond and other members of the Long Beach City Council decided to begin the process of renaming this stretch of road to Long Beach Boulevard.

In the 1970s, Long Beach Boulevard was lined with gay, lesbian, and transvestite bars. Sailors from the local Long Beach Naval Shipyard and Naval Station would enjoy all the bar activity. Sailors had to be careful of military police "Witch Hunts," where Shore Patrol (SP) would venture into the bars and pull sailors from the bar and into paddy wagons.

Public transportation
Bus service north of Artesia Boulevard is served by Metro Bus line 60. Service between Artesia Boulevard and the Long Beach Transit Mall is served by Long Beach Transit line 51.  Metro line 60 replaces Long Beach line 51 during early mornings and late evenings.

Rapid transit
The Metro C Line serves a station at Interstate 105. 

The Metro A Line falls in the middle of the boulevard between Willow and 1st Streets in Long Beach, serving the: Willow, PCH, Anaheim, 5th Street, and 1st Street stations.

References

Streets in Los Angeles County, California
Boulevards in the United States
Transportation in Long Beach, California